Oskar Loorits ( – 12 December 1961) was an Estonian folklorist.

Life
Loorits was born in Suure-Kõpu Parish, Viljandi County.  He initially studied folklore at the University of Tartu and obtained his doctorate in 1926. Between 1927 and 1941, he was a lecturer in Estonian and Comparative Folklore. Also during that period he was a director of the Estonian Folklore Archives. In 1938 he became a member of the Estonian Academy of Sciences. In 1944, he fled the Soviet occupation to Sweden and worked there until 1947 as an archive assistant. From then until shortly before his death he held a position in the folk archives of the University of Uppsala.  He died in Uppsala, aged 61.

Works
 Livonian fairy tales and fables variants. Helsingfors 1926 (Folklore Fellows' Communications Vol 21, 1 = No. 66).
 Estonian folk poetry and mythology. Tartu 1932.

References

1900 births
1961 deaths
People from Põhja-Sakala Parish
People from the Governorate of Livonia
Estonian folklorists
University of Tartu alumni
Members of the Estonian Academy of Sciences
Estonian World War II refugees
Estonian emigrants to Sweden
Estonian military personnel of the Estonian War of Independence
Burials at Raadi cemetery